St Andrew's Church is a church in Aylestone, Leicestershire. It is a Grade II* listed building.

History

The church is built of Triassic sandstone. The north aisle was added in the 13th century, as was the tower, which now has a broach spire. The 14th century saw the chancel, which is longer and wider than the nave, being built and the north aisle enlarged. The south aisle was added the following century and a clerestory was added.

References

Sources

Bibliography

Aylestone
Aylestone